The Pentremital Limestone Group is a geologic group in Arkansas. It preserves fossils dating back to the Carboniferous period.

See also

 List of fossiliferous stratigraphic units in Arkansas
 Paleontology in Arkansas

References

Carboniferous Arkansas
Geologic groups of Arkansas
Carboniferous System of North America